Empire Chapman was an  tanker which was built in 1942 by Harland & Wolff, Belfast for the  Ministry of War Transport (MoWT). In 1946 she was sold into merchant service and renamed British Commando. She was scrapped in 1959.

Description
The ship was built by Harland & Wolff Ltd, Belfast. She was launched in 1942 and completed on 25 June 1942.

She had a GRT of 8,194 and a NRT of 4,777.

The ship was propelled by a 4-stroke Single Cycle Single Acting diesel engine, which had eight cylinders of  diameter by  stroke. The engine was built by Harland & Wolff.

History
Empire Chapman was built for the MoWT. She was placed under the management of Sir R Ropner & Co Ltd. Her port of registry was Belfast. The Code Letters BDXV and United Kingdom Official Number 168512 were allocated.

Empire Chapman was a member of a number of convoys during the Second World War.

HX 239
Convoy HX 239 departed from New York on 13 May 1943 and arrived at Liverpool on 28 May. Empire Chapman was bound for the Stanlow Refinery, Ellesmere Port. She was equipped with Anti-torpedo nets.

HX 298
Convoy HX 298 departed from New York on 3 July 1944 and arrived at Liverpool on 18 July. Empire Chapman was bound for the Stanlow Refinery.

In 1944, Empire Champan was placed under the management of the British Tanker Co Ltd.  In 1946, Empire Chapman was sold to the British Tanker Co Ltd and was renamed British Commando. Her port of registry was changed to London. She served until 1959 when she was scrapped at Bruges, Belgium.

References

External links
 Photo of Empire Chapman

1942 ships
Ships built in Belfast
Tankers of the United Kingdom
Steamships of the United Kingdom
Ministry of War Transport ships
World War II tankers
Empire ships
Merchant ships of the United Kingdom
Ships built by Harland and Wolff